Autoroute 540 (Vaudreuil-Dorion) was a short spur route that connected Autoroute 20 to Autoroute 40, providing a direct freeway link from Windsor, Ontario (via Highway 401) to Quebec City, Rivière-du-Loup, and points east through A-40, as A-20 currently has several at-grade intersections in Vaudreuil-Dorion as a multi-lane divided road. A-540 was the shortest numbered Autoroute.

Absorption as part of Autoroute 30
In 2006, construction began to extend Autoroute 30 north of the St. Lawrence River (over a new crossing) to the existing junction with Autoroute 540 and Autoroute 20, necessitating reconstruction of that interchange. Once that was completed in December 2012, A-540 was annexed and re-designated as an extension of Autoroute 30, while the old alignment of A-30 south of Salaberry-de-Valleyfield was renamed Autoroute 530. This made the expanded A-30 a ring road serving the southwestern part of the Montreal metropolitan area.

Exit list
From south to north.

References

External links 

Transport Quebec
Transports Quebec Map 
A-540 at motorways-exits.com

40-5 (Vaudreuil-Dorion)
Vaudreuil-Dorion
Former provincial highways in Canada